The 2010–11 Long Island Blackbirds men's basketball team represented Long Island University during the 2010–11 NCAA Division I men's basketball season. The Blackbirds, led by 9th year head coach Jim Ferry, played their home games at the Athletic, Recreation & Wellness Center and are members of the Northeast Conference. They finished the season 27–6, 16–2 in NEC play to capture the regular season championship. They also won the 2011 Northeast Conference men's basketball tournament to earn an automatic bid in the 2011 NCAA Division I men's basketball tournament where they lost in the second round to North Carolina.

Roster

Schedule
 
|-
!colspan=9| Northeast Conference tournament

|-
!colspan=9| NCAA tournament

References

Long Island
Long Island
LIU Brooklyn Blackbirds men's basketball seasons
Long Island Blackbirds men's b
Long Island Blackbirds men's b